Rule 27 of the Gaelic Athletic Association (GAA), also known as "the Ban", was a rule in force from 1905 to 1971 that banned members of the GAA from playing or watching other sports such as rugby, soccer or hockey.

The rule

The text of Rule 27 originally read:

While potentially applying to any non-Irish sport, in practice the rule was mostly applied to English sports: rugby, football (soccer) and hockey were named initially, with cricket being added shortly afterward.  GAA members were prohibited from playing, watching or attending any event associated with these sports.  In some areas, "vigilance committees" were sent to football and rugby matches to check for any GAA members: any member who was found watching or playing could be expelled from the GAA.

Douglas Hyde

On 13 November 1938 Douglas Hyde, then President of Ireland and a patron of the GAA, attended an association football match at Dalymount Park between Ireland and Poland with the Taoiseach, Éamon de Valera.  

As a result, he was removed from his patronage and banned from the GAA, despite Hyde's being a founder of the Gaelic League and staunch supporter of the GAA. The GAA did not accept the principle that the President should be allowed to attend any sporting event until 1945.

Abolition

During the late 1960s, Rule 27 had become not only increasingly outdated, since football and rugby had come to be increasingly popular in Ireland, but also unenforceable, as GAA members had been able to watch these sports on television for some years. It was finally abolished at the GAA's annual congress in Belfast in 1971.

See also
 Paddy Andrews
 Jimmy Cooney (Tipperary hurler)
 Gerry Culliton
 Leonard McGrath
 Con Martin
 Paddy Neville
 Sean O'Connell
 Con Roche
 Joe Stynes

References

Bibliography
The GAA v Douglas Hyde: The Removal of Ireland’s First President as GAA Patron, Cormac Moore, The Collins Press

1905 establishments in Ireland
1971 disestablishments in Ireland
Gaelic Athletic Association terminology
27
Gaelic games controversies
History of the Gaelic Athletic Association
Politics and sports